Signed Japanese (日本語対応手話, Manually Coded Japanese), is a manually coded form of Japanese that uses the signs of Japanese Sign Language.  It is not a natural form of communication among deaf people.  It is not common, as sign language was banned in schools until 2002, and oral education was used instead.  Signed Japanese has some similarities to Pidgin Signed Japanese, which may be used by non-native signers.

Japanese
Japanese language